William Knightley-Smith (1 August 1932 – 31 July 1962) was an English amateur cricketer who played first-class cricket between 1952 and 1961.

Life and career
Bill Knightley-Smith was educated at Highgate School in North London, where he was captain of the cricket, football and fives teams. After Highgate he went to St John's College, Cambridge, where he won blues for cricket and football.

He played a full season for Middlesex in 1952 and was awarded his county cap, then played for Cambridge University from 1953 to 1955, and for Gloucestershire, where he was also Assistant Secretary, from 1955 to 1957. His highest first-class score was 95, the highest score in the match, for Cambridge against Essex in 1955.

He later became an insurance executive in Liverpool and Edinburgh. He collapsed and died on the eve of his 30th birthday while playing tennis in Edinburgh.

References

External links

1932 births
1962 deaths
People educated at Highgate School
Alumni of St John's College, Cambridge
English cricketers
Gloucestershire cricketers
Cricketers from Greater London
Middlesex cricketers
Cambridge University cricketers
Marylebone Cricket Club cricketers
Free Foresters cricketers